is a series of tactical role-playing video games published by Square, now Square Enix. The first game of the series was published in 1995 and was developed by G-Craft, a studio that was later absorbed by Square as Product Development Division-6. G-Craft or Division-6 has produced every Front Mission game since, with the exceptions of Front Mission Series: Gun Hazard (Omiya Soft), Front Mission Evolved (Double Helix Games), and Front Mission 2089: Border of Madness (h.a.n.d.). Since the release of the original game, the series has gone on to encompass several media, including films, manga, novels, radio dramas, and toys. The video games in the series have also ventured into other genres besides tactical role-playing, such as side-scrolling shooter, real-time strategy, third-person shooter, and massively multiplayer online games. The main storyline of the series encompasses seven different games. In addition to these, five spin-off titles have been produced, set both in the same universe as the main games and in alternate worlds.

The initial selling point of Front Mission was its storytelling approach. Taking place during the 21st and 22nd centuries, the series revolves around military conflicts and political tension between powerful supranational unions and their member states. Although the Front Mission video games use self-contained, standalone stories, these tie into a greater overarching storyline that encompasses the entire series. In combination with the stories from its other media, the series possesses a level of storytelling depth and continuity comparable to a serial drama.

Video games

Main series

Spin-offs

Compilations

Other media

Manga and novels

Commercials

Radio dramas

Toys
The Front Mission series has spawned a number of action figures and model kits. In 1997, with the release of Front Mission 2, Kotobukiya released three resin kits depicting certain wanzers (mecha) from the game, such as the Zenith V. In 1999, Kotobukiya's ARTFX team produced a line of six-inch action figures depicting wanzers seen in Front Mission 3 such as the Zenith RV. Toy distributor Palisades released these figures In North America in 2000, and they were later reissued in different colors.

In September 2004, after the release of Front Mission 4, Kotobukiya collaborated with Square Enix to release the Front Mission Trading Arts series, a line of highly realistic three-inch blind-box figures of wanzers. The Front Mission History collection also had their own small figures. The first wave of Trading Arts figures comprised wanzers from Front Mission  and Front Mission 4, which was re-released as Front Mission Trading Arts Plus Stage I in February 2005. One wanzer each from Front Mission 1st through Scars of the War was featured in Front Mission Trading Arts Plus Stage II, which was released in February 2006. Glen Duval's Kyojun wanzer from Stage II was a pre-order reward for Front Mission 5. Re-releases of this line featured wanzers in army green, matte, or metallic colors. Square Enix also released figures from Front Mission Evolved as part of its Play Arts Kai line, which include the Zenith, Enyo, and Zephyr.

Books
The Front Mission series has produced a number of strategy guides and related books for their respective video games. Notable books released from the series include an artbook titled "Silence" The Art of Front Mission 1995-2003 and a reference book titled Front Mission World Historica: Report of Conflicts 1970-2121. The "Silence" artbook showcases conceptual artwork drawn by Yoshitaka Amano for Front Mission, Front Mission: Gun Hazard, and the Front Mission First remake. The "World Historica" reference book covers all relevant data in the main series universe, from before the events of Front Mission Alternative to the end of Front Mission 5: Scars of the War. Front Mission: Gun Hazard and Front Mission Evolved are not covered in the reference book.

Music albums

References

External links
Front Mission official website at Square-Enix.com 

Media
Media lists by video games franchise
Mass media by franchise